Rotorua is a city in the Bay of Plenty Region of New Zealand's North Island. The city lies on the southern shores of Lake Rotorua, from which it takes its name. It is the seat of the Rotorua Lakes District, a territorial authority encompassing Rotorua and several other nearby towns.

Rotorua is a major destination for both domestic and international tourists; the tourism industry is by far the largest industry in the district. It is known for its geothermal activity, and features geysers – notably the Pōhutu Geyser at Whakarewarewa – and hot mud pools. This thermal activity is sourced to the Rotorua Caldera, in which the town lies. Rotorua is home to the Toi Ohomai Institute of Technology.

History 
Roto means 'lake' and rua means 'two' or in this case 'second' – Rotorua thus meaning 'Second lake'. Kahumatamomoe was the uncle of the Māori chief Ihenga, the ancestral explorer of the Te Arawa. It was the second major lake the chief discovered, and he dedicated it to his uncle. It is the largest of a multitude of lakes found to the northeast, all connected with the Rotorua Caldera and nearby Mount Tarawera. The name can also mean the equally appropriate 'Crater lake'.

The area was initially settled by Māori of the Te Arawa Iwi in the 14th century. During the early 1820s Ngāpuhi led by chief Hongi Hika launched a series of raids into the Bay of Plenty as a part of the Musket Wars, in 1823 a Ngapuhi raiding party led by Hongi Hika attacked Te Arawa at their Pā (Fortified settlement) on Mokoia Island defeating them. The first European in the area was probably Phillip Tapsell who was trading from the Bay of Plenty coast at Maketu from 1828. He later married into Te Arawa and became highly regarded by them. Missionaries Henry Williams and Thomas Chapman visited in 1831 and Chapman and his wife established a mission at Te Koutu in 1835. This was abandoned within a year but Chapman returned in 1838 and established a second mission at Mokoia Island.

The lakeshore was a prominent site of skirmishes during the New Zealand Wars of the 1860s. A "special town district" was created in 1883, to promote Rotorua's potential as a spa destination. The town was connected to Auckland with the opening of the Rotorua Branch railway and commencement of the Rotorua Express train in 1894, resulting in the rapid growth of the town and tourism from this time forward. Rotorua was established as a borough in 1922, elected its first mayor in 1923, and declared a city in 1962 before becoming a district in 1979.

Geography

Climate
The Rotorua region enjoys a mild temperate climate (Cfb). Rotorua is situated inland from the coast and is sheltered by high country to the south and east of the city, resulting in less wind than many other places in New Zealand. During the winter months June – August temperatures can drop below 0 °C. Frost is common in Rotorua during its winter months, with an average of 57 ground frosts annually, and 20 nights per year below 0 °C. Snowfall in Rotorua is rare and since the 1970s has only been recorded twice. On 15 August 2011 and 13 July 2017 snowflakes fell in the town centre, and during the July 2017 snowfall, snow accumulated in the nearby Mamaku ranges and in the outer reaches of the district, where snowfall occurs on average once every three years.

Suburbs
Inner suburbs

Outer suburbs

Geothermal areas

Thermal activity is at the heart of much of Rotorua's tourist appeal. Geysers and bubbling mud pools, hot thermal springs and Te Wairoa ("The Buried Village") — so named after it was buried by the 1886 Mount Tarawera eruption— are within easy reach of Rotorua.

In Kuirau Park, to the west end of Rotorua, hot bubbling mud pools dot the park. Visitors can soak their feet in hot pools.

A common nickname for Rotorua is "Sulphur City" due to the hydrogen sulphide emissions, which gives the city a smell similar to "rotten eggs", as well as "Rotten-rua" combining its legitimate name and the rotten smell prevalent. Another common nickname is "Roto-Vegas", likening the city's own strip of road flanked by businesses and restaurants to that of Las Vegas.

The especially pungent smell in the central-east 'Te Ngae' area is due to the dense sulphur deposits located next to the southern boundary of the Government Gardens, in the area known as 'Sulphur Point'.

Lakes

The Rotorua region has 17 lakes, known collectively as the Lakes of Rotorua. Fishing, waterskiing, swimming and other water activities are popular in summer. The lakes are also used for event venues; Rotorua hosted the 2007 World Waterski Championships and Lake Rotorua was the venue for the World Blind Sailing Championships in March 2009. Lake Rotorua is also used as a departure and landing point for float planes.

Demography 

The Rotorua urban area had a usual resident population of 54,204 at the 2018 New Zealand census, an increase of 5,289 people (10.8%) since the 2013 census. There were 26,211 males and 27,993 females, giving a sex ratio of 0.936 males per female. Of the total population, 12,366 people (22.8%) were aged up to 15 years, 11,052 (20.4%) were 15 to 29, 22,980 (42.4%) were 30 to 64, and 7,809 (14.4%) were 65 or older.

In terms of ethnicity, 59.2% were European/Pākehā, 42.3% were Māori, 6.2% were Pacific peoples, 11.5% were Asian, and 1.5% were other ethnicities (totals add to more than 100% since people could identify with multiple ethnicities).

Government

Local 

In October 2013, Steve Chadwick was elected Mayor of Rotorua and was re-elected in the 2016 mayoral election and the 2019 mayoral election. She previously served as the Member of Parliament for Rotorua between 1999 and 2008, and served as a Cabinet Minister in the Fifth Labour Government.

In 2022, Tania Tapsell was elected as the Mayor of Rotorua. She is the first woman of Māori descent to hold the role.

Coat of arms

National 
Rotorua is covered by the Rotorua electorate for the general roll and the Waiariki electorate for the Māori roll.

Attractions
Rotorua is also home to botanical gardens and historic architecture. Known as a spa town and major tourist resort since the 1800s, many of its buildings hint at this history. Government Gardens, close to the lake-shore at the eastern edge of the town, are a particular point of pride. The Rotorua Museum of Art and History is housed in the large Tudor-style bath house building while the Art Deco style Blue Baths, noted for their embrace of mixed sex bathing in the 1930s, remain open today.

Another of Rotorua's attractions is mountain biking. Whakarewarewa Forest was listed as one of the Top 8 locations globally by Red Bull Magazine in 2012. The forest includes over 100 km of mountain bike trails and in August 2006 was a host of the UCI Mountain Bike and Trials World Championships. In 2015 Rotorua hosted the Southern Hemisphere leg of the Crankworx mountain bike event.

The Rotorua Pistol club is among the largest in the Southern Hemisphere and hosted the 2013 Australasian IPSC Handgun Championship.

The Kaituna River, 15 minutes drive north east of the CBD provides class 5 whitewater kayaking and rafting through a spectacular tree lined gorge.

The region is home to 16 lakes. These are popular for recreation such as boating and fishing. Several of the lakes are stocked for sports fishing with trout from the Fish and Game New Zealand hatchery at Ngongotahā.

Another visitor attraction in the Ngongotahā area is the Wingspan National Bird of Prey Centre.  It is a captive breeding facility and visitor centre located in the Ngongotahā Valley.. Wingspan undertakes conservation, education and research activities related to birds of prey found in New Zealand, and provides demonstrations of falconry.

Transport

Road
Rotorua is served by state highways 5, 30, and 30A, and the Thermal Explorer Highway touring route, with state highways 33 and 36 terminating on the outskirts of the town.

State Highway 5, running concurrently with the Thermal Explorer Highway, is the main north–south route through Rotorua, bypassing the town centre to the west. North of the town at Ngongotahā, State Highway 36 splits off to provide a route to Tauranga via Pyes Pa, while State Highway 5 turns westward, connecting to State Highway 1 at Tīrau and providing the main route into Rotorua from Hamilton and Auckland. To the south, State Highway 5 provides the main route from Taupō, Hawke's Bay, Manawatu, and Wellington.

State Highway 30 runs southwest to northeast through the town. It enters the town in the southwest (running concurrently with SH 5), before crossing the southern suburbs to the shore of Lake Rotorua east of the town centre. It then runs through the suburb of Te Ngae, before splitting off SH 33 to continue eastwards.

State Highway 30A runs northwest to southeast, connecting State Highways 5 and 30 with each other via the town centre.

Bus 
Rotorua has a local bus service, with 11 routes under the Baybus brand, serving the urban area, mostly at half hourly intervals, operated by Reesby Buses. Bike racks were introduced in 2017 and Bee cards for fares on 27 July 2020. Trial commuter services between Rotorua and Tauranga are running in each direction until the end of 2021. The city is also served by InterCity and services to local tourist sites.

History 
Edwin Robertson, who died aged 74 in 1931, started with pack horses in 1869 and ran coaches from 1873. In 1902 the Tauranga route was sold and became Robertson & Co, then, about 1903, Rotorua Motor Coaching Co. Ltd. In 1904 Hot Lakes Transport, which ran trips to Taupo, Waiotapu and all the lakes, and Rotorua Motor Coaching added motor cars to their fleets of coaches. In 1905 E. Robertson & Co moved from Ohinemutu to the new town, close to the new railway station, which remained the main stop until InterCity moved to their stop from Hinemoa / Fenton Street to the Tourism Office in 1995. The last coach ran in 1919. When Hot Lakes Transport's assets were sold in 1920, they had 10 coaches and 3 motor cars. In September 1920 Rotorua Motor Transport Co. was formed and took over Hot Lakes Transport Co. and Rotorua Motor Coaching Co, continuing with similar services. In 1926 a consortium of local operators formed Rotorua Bus Co. During 1922 Kusab's transport company became K Motors, which was taken over by the railways in 1938. Rotorua Motor Transport and Rotorua Bus Co followed in 1940 and all became part of New Zealand Railways Road Services.

Air
Air New Zealand provides daily turbo-prop flights between Rotorua and Auckland, Wellington, and Christchurch airports. Previously Qantas also operated Boeing 737 aircraft from Christchurch, but upon their departure from domestic flights in New Zealand this was discontinued.

Scenic and chartered flights in both helicopters and float planes are operated by Volcanic Air who are based on Rotorua's lake front.

From 2009 to 2015 there was also an international link, with direct Sydney to Rotorua flights.

Rail
Rotorua is connected to the rail network by the Rotorua Branch line from Putāruru. Up until 2001, passenger trains ran from Auckland to Rotorua via Hamilton daily using Silver Fern railcars, terminating north of the town centre at Koutu (the original station on Amohau Street was closed and relocated to Koutu in 1989). However, owing to poor advertising of the service and the location of the station being a 15-minute walk from the town centre in an industrial area, passenger services stopped in October 2001. Freight services on the line declined over the decades up until the nightly freight service stopped in 2000, largely due to a continual move of freight and passengers onto road transport using ever-improving highways in the region. The line is currently disused.

Education

Tertiary
Rotorua is home to the central campus of Toi Ohomai Institute of Technology, which provides a range of Certificate, Diploma and a limited number of degree-level programmes. The largest programmes on offer are Te Reo Māori (Māori language), nursing, forestry, business, computing, tourism and hospitality. Toi Ohomai Institute of Technology is the third largest tertiary education institution in New Zealand with campuses throughout the Bay of Plenty region.

Secondary
Rotorua has five secondary schools:
 John Paul College, a co-educational, state-integrated Catholic school for Years 7–13 with about 1200 students
 Rotorua Boys' High School, a state boys school for Years 9–13 with about 1000 students
 Rotorua Girls' High School, a state girls school for Years 9–13 with about 600 students
 Rotorua Lakes High School serving the eastern suburbs. A co-educational state school for Years 9–13 with about 700 students
 Western Heights High School serving the western suburbs. A co-educational state school for Years 9–13 with about 1200 students

Students can also attend Te Rangihakahaka Centre for Science and Techbnology, a Māori- and English-medium special character school from years 1–10. It currently has around 100 students. Students here need to attend a mainstream secondary school or Kura Kaupapa Māori for their senior secondary schooling.

Kura Kaupapa Māori (Māori language immersion schools)
Rotorua has four Kura Kaupapa Māori:
Te Wharekura o Ngāti Rongomai years 0–13 with about 115 students in eastern Rotorua
Te Kura Kaupapa Māori O Te Koutu years 0–13 with about 240 students in western Rotorua
Te Kura Kaupapa Māori O Ruamata years 0–13 with about 240 students in semi-rural eastern Rotorua
Te Kura Kaupapa Māori O Hurungaterangi years 0–8 with about 80 students in central Rotorua

Media
Rotorua has several media organisations, including the Rotorua Daily Post, More FM Rotorua and The Hits Rotorua.

Sister cities
Rotorua's sister cities are:
Beppu, Japan
Klamath Falls, United States
Lake Macquarie, Australia
Wuzhong (Suzhou), China

Notable people

 Valerie Adams, Olympic shot putter
 Steven Adams, basketball player
 Israel Adesanya, mixed martial artist, former UFC Middleweight Champion
 Michael Barker, drummer
 Jean Batten, aviator
 Sam Bewley, Olympic cyclist
 Manu Bennett, actor
 Trent Boult, New Zealand cricketer
 Scott Curry, All Blacks 7s, Bay of Plenty 7s
 Cliff Curtis, actor
 Julian Dean, road racing cyclist
 Mike Delany, rugby union player, All Black
 Dame Susan Devoy, squash player
 Tom Donnelly, All Black, rugby union player
 Alan Duff, writer
 Gary Jeshel Forrester, musician, writer, academic
 Jack Foster, Olympic marathon runner
 Tony Gordon, rugby league player and coach
 Bevan Hari, hockey player
 Dylan Hartley, rugby union player (For the English National Team.)
Tame Iti, maori activist
 David Kosoof, Olympic hockey player
 Danny Lee, professional golfer
 Dennis List, poet and writer
 Angus Hikairo Macfarlane, educator
 Steve McDowall, All Black
Hinematau McNeill (also writing as Naomi Te Hiini) academic and treaty negotiator
 Jon Mark, Musician. solo artist and co-founder of Mark-Almond
 Tony Marsh, rugby union player (for French national team)
 Elizabeth Marvelly, soprano
 Liam Messam, rugby union player (for Waikato and NZ)
 Sir Howard Morrison, entertainer
 Temuera Morrison, actor.
 Craig Newby, All Black
 Caleb Ralph, All Black
 William Ripia, rugby union player (Wellington Hurricanes, Western Force, Bay of Plenty, Otago Highlanders, Maori All Black)
 Joe Royal, rugby union player (Bay of Plenty Steamers and Māori All Blacks)
 Ben Sandford, Olympic men's skeleton racer
 Wayne "Buck" Shelford, former All Black
 Miriama Smith, actress
 Sir Peter Tapsell, politician
 Te Pokiha Taranui, tribal leader and soldier
 Ngahuia Te Awekotuku, academic, scholar activist, Emeritus Professor
 Sir Gordon Tietjens, New Zealand and Samoan Sevens rugby coach
 Jared Waerea-Hargreaves, rugby league player (Sydney Roosters and New Zealand Kiwis)
 Dean Whare, rugby league player (Penrith Panthers and New Zealand Kiwis)

References

External links 

 
 Info-Rotorua | Visitor Information TV & website
 Official Rotorua YouTube channel
 
 
 

 
Populated places in the Bay of Plenty Region
Territorial authorities of New Zealand
Spa towns in New Zealand
Populated places on Lake Rotorua